Mitchell Jay Gaylord (born March 10, 1961) is an American gymnast, actor, and Olympic gold medalist.

Early life
Gaylord was born in Van Nuys, California, the son of Fred and Linda Gaylord, and is Jewish. Gaylord graduated from Grant High School. He competed in the 1981 Maccabiah Games, winning five gold medals.

Career

Gymnastics 
He made his first U.S. National team in gymnastics in 1980 and continued to retain his place on the team until 1984. While attending UCLA as a history major on scholarship, he won the All-Around in the 1983 and 1984 USA Gymnastics National Championships, and the 1984 NCAA Men's Gymnastics Championship. He then qualified for the Olympic Games during the Olympic trials held from June 1–3, 1984 in Jacksonville Florida. Two of the moves in his arsenal going into the Games were invented by and named for him—the Gaylord flip and the Gaylord II.

In June 2007, Gaylord was named the seventh-best U.S. gymnast of all time by Yahoo Sports. In 1990, he was inducted into the Southern California Jewish Sports Hall of Fame. He was also named to the UCLA Hall of Fame in 1995, the US Olympic Hall of Fame in 2005, and the International Jewish Sports Hall of Fame in 2009.

1984 Olympic Games
In the 1984 Summer Olympic Games, Gaylord led the gold-medal-winning U.S. men's gymnastics team, becoming the first American gymnast to score a perfect 10.00 in the Olympics. He also won the silver medal in vault, the bronze in parallel bars and the bronze in the rings. In addition to his individual accolades, Gaylord led the US men's gymnastics team to a gold medal in the team competition for the first and only time in Olympics history. The moment was heralded as a significant upset over the teams from China and Japan. After the 1984 Olympics he and his fellow Olympic gymnasts went on a six-month promotional tour across the US, selling out arenas in about two dozen American cities. He also wrote his first book during this period, centering on using gymnastics exercises to train. He was also named by President Ronald Reagan as a member of the President's Council on Physical Fitness and Sports in November 1985.

Acting
Gaylord has appeared in several movies and TV shows. Most notably, he performed as a stunt double for Chris O'Donnell (as Robin) and the uncredited role of Mitch Grayson (Robin's older brother) in the 1995 movie Batman Forever, and played the lead in American Anthem (1986), opposite actress Janet Jones. The latter movie, in which Gaylord played a gymnast training for the Olympics, has been noted as an inspiration to future generations of Olympic gymnasts. He was also a frequent guest star on Hollywood Squares, and appeared in advertisements for Diet Coke, Nike, Inc., Vidal Sassoon, Soloflex, Levi Strauss & Co., and Texaco.

Gaylord has also remained an ambassador to the sport of gymnastics, serving as a commentator for NBC and Fox Sports during televised gymnastics events, as well as developing several nationally-televised fitness programs and products.

Later career 
Since retiring from acting, Gaylord has worked as a financial advisor at Morgan Stanley Smith Barney. He has also been an advocate for child allergy awareness.

Personal life
Gaylord was married to Valentina Agius with whom he has two children together. He was previously married to model and actress Deborah Driggs, with whom he has three children.

Filmography

Film

Television

See also
List of Olympic medalists in gymnastics (men)
List of select Jewish gymnasts

References

External links

Official website

1961 births
American male artistic gymnasts
College men's gymnastics coaches in the United States
Gymnasts at the 1984 Summer Olympics
Jewish American male actors
Jewish American sportspeople
Jewish gymnasts
Living people
Originators of elements in artistic gymnastics
Gymnasts from Los Angeles
UCLA Bruins men's gymnasts
People from Van Nuys, Los Angeles
Medalists at the 1984 Summer Olympics
Olympic gold medalists for the United States in gymnastics
Olympic silver medalists for the United States in gymnastics
Olympic bronze medalists for the United States in gymnastics
Grant High School (Los Angeles) alumni
International Jewish Sports Hall of Fame inductees
21st-century American Jews